"This Is Our Night" is a 2009 song by Sakis Rouvas, or the Greek version "Pio Dinata". 

This Is Our Night may also refer to:
"This Is Our Night", song by The Staples Singers, Gary Goetzman & Mike Piccirillo 1984, also sampled on Rookie Card (album)
"This Is Our Night", song by Anita Perras and Tim Taylor
"This Is Our Night", song by Julee Cruise from The Voice of Love
"Baby, Come Over (This Is Our Night)", song by Samantha Mumba
"This Is Our Night", song by Isabel Pantoja on Cambiar Por Ti
"This Is Our Night", song by Half Japanese from 1997 album Heaven Sent